The Church of All Saints, Murston, Sittingbourne, is an Anglican parish church in the county of Kent, England.  It is notable due to its architect, William Burges, and was constructed in 1873–4.  The church was built in "an early Gothic Style" and incorporates fragments of the original 12th-century church. The estimate was £3,000 but the public subscription raised only £2,000.  As a consequence, the intended tower was truncated. It is a Grade II listed building as of 13 December 1974.

The church is the base for the Murston Community Bank, an initiative undertaken by the Diocese of Canterbury in conjunction with the Kent Savers Credit Union. Church services are not undertaken at All Saints.

Notes

References

External links
 All Saints Church, Murston

Churches completed in 1874
Murston
Gothic Revival church buildings in England
Murston
Murston
William Burges church buildings
Diocese of Canterbury
Sittingbourne